This is a list of notable professional and semi-professional paintball leagues.

North American leagues

Professional speedball leagues 
 American Paintball League (APL)
 National Professional Paintball League (NPPL)
 National Speedball League (NSL)
 National Xball League (NXL)
 Paintball Sports Promotions (PSP)

Collegiate speedball league 
 National Collegiate Paintball Association (NCPA) - Nationwide association that sanctions college and high school competition.

Professional woodball leagues 
 Ultimate Woodsball League (UWL)
 South Florida Woodsball League (SFWL)
 Iron City classic paintball league (ICPL)

U.S. regional leagues
 Eastern Regional Field Owners Association (ERFOA) - Regional league serving the New England area. Match style xball with Major (unranked) and minor (D3 and lower) divisions.  
 Capital Edge Paintball League (CEPL) - Regional league serving the Northern California area.  3-Man, 5-Man D5/4 level play.
 NorthEast Paintball Series (NEPS) - Regional league serving the New England area. 5-man Division 4/Novice & Division 5/Rookie level play
 Mid-West Paintball League (MWPL)
 Northern Xtreme Paintball League (NXPL)
 New England Paintball League (NEPL)

Latin American leagues
 Costa Rica Xball League (CXL) - Speedball league present in Costa Rica, 5Man and 2Man format with minor divisions.
 Torneo Argentino de Paintball (TAP) - Speedball league in Argentina, runs 3 divisions since 2005. Organized by Asociación Argentina de Paintball.

Canadian leagues 
 Canadian Xtreme Paintball League (CXPL)
 Eastern Paintball Player League (EPPL) - Paintball league in the Maritime provinces
 Mirabel Impact Paintball League (MIPL)
 Ontario Paintball League (OPL)

European paintball leagues
 Irish Woodsball League (IWL) - Ireland's premier woodsball league with teams from all over Ireland competing in a 7-man format with 4 rounds per season. P P
 Millennium Series - Pan-European paintball league

Australian paintball
 Super7s Paintball

PALM (Paintball League Middle-East)
Paintball West Asia

References